Z: The Beginning of Everything is an American period drama television series created by Dawn Prestwich and Nicole Yorkin for Amazon Studios that debuted on November 5, 2015. It is based on Z: A Novel of Zelda Fitzgerald by Therese Anne Fowler. The series presents a fictionalized version of the life of American socialite and writer Zelda Sayre Fitzgerald (Christina Ricci) in the 1920s. The first season covers her marriage to the author F. Scott Fitzgerald – who had yet to become famous for his work – and the subsequent marital tensions that arose from their lifestyle full of partying and alcohol.

The first season was released on January 27, 2017.
On April 27, 2017 it was revealed that Amazon had ordered a second season. It was then announced on September 7, 2017, that Amazon had rescinded the renewal, cancelling the show after one season.

Cast

Main cast 
 Christina Ricci as Zelda Fitzgerald
 David Hoflin as F. Scott Fitzgerald 
 David Strathairn as Judge Anthony Sayre

Recurring cast 
Christina Bennett Lind as Tallulah Bankhead
Natalie Knepp as Eugenia Bankhead
Kristine Nielsen as Minnie Sayre
Holly Curran as Tilde Sayre
Jamie Anne Allman as Tootsie Sayre
Maya Kazan as Livye Hart
Sarah Schenkkan as Eleanor Browder
Jun Naito as Tana Fujimora
Jordan Dean as Ludlow Fowler
Andrew Bridges as Winston

Episodes

References

External links 
 

2010s American drama television series
2015 American television series debuts
2017 American television series endings
Amazon Prime Video original programming
Television series by Amazon Studios
Cultural depictions of F. Scott Fitzgerald